The 2019 AON Open Challenger was a professional tennis tournament played on clay courts. It was the seventeenth edition of the tournament which was part of the 2019 ATP Challenger Tour. It took place in Genoa, Italy between 2 and 8 September 2019.

Singles main-draw entrants

Seeds

 1 Rankings are as of 26 August 2019.

Other entrants
The following players received wildcards into the singles main draw:
  Philipp Kohlschreiber
  Lorenzo Musetti
  Andrea Pellegrino
  Lorenzo Sonego
  Giulio Zeppieri

The following players received entry into the singles main draw as alternates:
  Thomaz Bellucci
  Julian Lenz

The following players received entry from the qualifying draw:
  Alex Molčan
  Andrea Vavassori

Champions

Singles

  Lorenzo Sonego def.  Alejandro Davidovich Fokina 6–2, 4–6, 7–6(8–6).

Doubles

  Ariel Behar /  Gonzalo Escobar def.  Guido Andreozzi /  Andrés Molteni 3–6, 6–4, [10–3].

References

AON Open Challenger
2019
2019 in Italian tennis
September 2019 sports events in Europe